The Extreme Model Railroad and Contemporary Architecture Museum is a museum proposed for North Adams, Massachusetts that plans to display model trains running through a landscape of notable modern architecture. Architect Frank Gehry has contracted to design the new museum, which will be located a few blocks away from the MASS MoCA modern art museum.  Thomas Krens, former director of the Guggenheim Museum who oversaw the creation of the Gehry-designed Guggenheim Museum Bilbao and Guggenheim Abu Dhabi, and a Mass MoCA founder, is heading the creation of the new museum.

The plan calls for an 83,000-square-foot museum to be built at an estimated cost to $65 million, featuring model trains running continuously past scale-models of buildings by notable architects including Louis Sullivan, Frank Lloyd Wright, and Frank Gehry.  It will be built on publicly owned land overlooking a disused rail freight yard; the proposed Museum holds an option to purchase the land.  About half of the financing is projected to come from state and local government funds allocated to support the growth of tourism, and half from private donations of which $2.5 million had been raised by August 2017.

As of 2017 the projected opening date was 2020, but as of February 2022 the new projected opening date is 2025.

References

Planned new art museums and galleries
Railroad museums in Massachusetts
Buildings and structures in North Adams, Massachusetts
Contemporary art galleries in the United States
Museums in Berkshire County, Massachusetts
Art museums and galleries in Massachusetts
Modernist architecture in Massachusetts
Architecture museums in the United States